Eupithecia mekrana is a moth in the family Geometridae. It is found from the steppen chalk hills in the Orenburg province in south-eastern European Russia in the north to Saudi Arabia in the south. It is also found in the eastern provinces of Turkey, Armenia, Azerbaijan, Afghanistan and Iran.

References

Moths described in 1941
mekrana
Moths of Europe
Moths of Asia